Karnataka Public Works Department (also known as Karnataka Public Works, Ports and Inland Water Transport Department or KPWD) is a government ministry Government of Karnataka agency in charge of the public works in the state of Karnataka, India. It is entrusted with the responsibility of construction and maintenance of buildings for most of the Karnataka government departments and Public undertakings and maintenance of road works including the National Highways, State Highways and Major District roads.

History
The public works department was established in 1856 in the then Mysore State. Prior to this the Revenue officers were responsible for public works in the state.

References

External links
 

State agencies of Karnataka
State Public Works Departments of India
Buildings and structures in Bangalore